Poonia or Punia is a clan (or gotra) of Jats.

Notable people who bear the surname and may or may not be associated with the clan include:
 Jai Narayan Poonia (1934–2021), Indian politician
 Krishna Poonia, Indian discus thrower
 Navdeep Poonia, Scottish cricket player
 Poonam Poonia, Indian cricketer
 Surendra Poonia, Indian sportsman
 Bajrang Punia, Indian wrestler
 Bijender Kumar Punia, vice chancellor of Maharshi Dayanand University
 Deepak Punia (cricketer), Indian cricketer
 Pavitra Punia, Indian actress
 Savita Punia, Indian field hockey player
 Seema Punia (also known as Seema Antil), Indian discus thrower
 Priya Punia, Indian Cricket player
 Mandeep Punia, freelance journalist from India

References

Jat clans